Roberto Hernandez Stadium is a former minor league and current collegiate baseball stadium, located in Aiken, South Carolina. It is currently the home of the USC Aiken Pacers. Built in 2003, the stadium was named after USC Aiken alumnus and former major league pitcher, Roberto Hernández. The stadium has a capacity of 1,000 and has a fully operational concession stand. The stadium also has a dedicated Hall of Fame to Hernandez, which contains several items of baseball memorabilia and awards belonging to him.

The stadium was briefly the home of the Aiken Foxhounds, of the South Coast League in 2007. The Foxhounds folded after the league went into bankruptcy and never returned.

External links

References 

Minor league baseball venues
Baseball venues in South Carolina
Sports venues in Aiken County, South Carolina
South Coast League venues
2003 establishments in South Carolina
Sports venues completed in 2003
College baseball venues in the United States
USC Aiken Pacers baseball